The Fox News presents a variety of programming with up to 20 hours of live programming per day. Most of the programs are broadcast from Fox News headquarters in New York City in their street-side studio on Sixth Avenue in the west extension of Rockefeller Center. The network's other programs are broadcast from Fox News' studio in Washington, D.C., located on Capitol Hill across from Union Station, as well as in the Fox News Texas Studios in Las Colinas, Irving, Texas and Los Angeles, California. Audio simulcasts of the channel are aired on XM Satellite Radio and Sirius Satellite Radio. Fox News also hosts a website with a number of political columnists and weblogs.

Hard-news programming currently broadcasts at:

 Weekdays: 12:00am / 9:00am-12:00pm / 1:00pm-5:00pm / 6:00pm
 Saturday: 10:00am-3:00pm / 4:00pm-5:00pm 
 Sunday: 12:00pm-2:00pm / 3:00pm-5:00pm

Current shows

Special programming 
 All American New Year, the network's annual New Year's celebration program
 America's Election Headquarters, the network's biennial campaign and election coverage, culminating with Election Night

Previous programming
 212 with Brian Kilmeade, a show focusing on New York City
 After Hours with Cal Thomas, a weekend talk show, focused around conversations with newsmakers and featured a weekly commentary by the host, named "Column One"
 America At War, a continuous news/talk program covering the beginning of the 2003 invasion of Iraq
 America Live, a two-hour afternoon newscast anchored by Megyn Kelly February 1, 2010 – September 27, 2013; canceled when Kelly left in 2013 for a primetime weeknight newscast called The Kelly File 
 America's Election Headquarters, a weekday news/politics program, hosted by Bill Hemmer and Megyn Kelly
America's News Headquarters, a weekday and weekend news/politics program
America's Pulse with E. D. Hill
 The Beltway Boys, a half-hour show that explored the scene from inside the Beltway  Hosted by Fred Barnes and Mort Kondracke
 Beyond the News, a talk program, hosted by Dr. Georgia Witkin
 The Big Story, hosted by John Gibson and Heather Nauert
Bill Hemmer Reports, previously Studio B/Shepard Smith Reporting, an American television news/opinion/talk program on Fox News Channel hosted by Bill Hemmer and formerly Shepard Smith, which aired from 2002 to 2021.
 The Crier Report, a talk program that featured various personalities, hosted by Catherine Crier
 Crime Scene, an occasional true crime program made up of stories from the Fox News archives, hosted by Greta Van Susteren
 Crime Wave, a newsmagazine program focusing on crime, hosted by Jon Scott
The Daily Briefing with Dana Perino, a midday show that focuses on news of the day
 DaySide, a weekday news/talk program featuring a studio audience
 Drudge, a talk program hosted by Matt Drudge
 The Edge with Paula Zahn, a talk program that featured celebrities and politicians
 Entertainment Coast to Coast, a talk program about entertainment, hosted by Bill McCuddy and Juliet Huddy
 Fox Magazine with Laurie Dhue, a newsmagazine that focused around in-depth reports, but also news of the previous week
 Fox News Now, the first program to air on the network, focused on all the news in only fifteen minutes
 Fox News Watch, hosted by Eric Breindel 1997-1998 Eric Burns 1998-2008 E. D. Hill 2008 and finally Jon Scott 2008-2013 
 Fox on..., FNC's rolling programming focusing on select topics, each running about 20 minutes
 Fox Online, a weekday program connecting the network with its website, FoxNews.com, and hosted by Bill Hemmer (returned as a weekend program before taken off)
 Fox Wire, a news/talk program, hosted by Rita Cosby
 Fox X-press, FNC's original morning program before Fox & Friends
 Glenn Beck, an hour-long political opinion program, hosted by Glenn Beck
The Greg Gutfeld Show, a Saturday night talk show hosted by Greg Gutfeld, later rebranded to "Gutfeld!" and became a weekday show.
 The 1/2 Hour News Hour, a half-hour television news satire show hosted by Jennifer Robertson; produced by FNC's sister division 20th Century Fox Television)
 Hannity & Colmes, co-anchored by Sean Hannity and Alan Colmes (1996-2009)
 Hannity's America, a program featuring 2-on-2 debate, interviews with people on the street, and other elements; hosted by Sean Hannity
 Happening Now, a program covered by Jon Scott covering the latest headlines of the morning
 Heartland with John Kasich
 Hot Shots!, a compilation of videos from the Fox Reports "Across America" and "Around the World in 80 Seconds"
 Huckabee, talk show with musical features hosted by former Arkansas Governor and Presidential candidate Mike Huckabee
 The Insiders, a talk program, hosted by E. D. Hill
 Judith Regan Tonight, a weekend talk program hosted by Judith Regan
 Just In, hosted by Laura Ingraham
 The Kelly File, hosted by Megyn Kelly
 The Live Desk, hosted by Martha MacCallum and Trace Gallagher
 Money News Now, a weekend two hour business news broadcast
 Movietone News, an hour-long show focusing on nostalgic news (named after former Fox Movietone newsreels)
 Only on Fox, a show featuring stories which only FNC brought to its viewers that other networks didn't, hosted by Trace Gallagher
 On the Record with Greta Van Susteren, an evening news program hosted by Greta Van Susteren from 2002 until her departure from the network in September 2016. Subsequently, hosted by Brit Hume from September 2016 until the shows end in November 2016.
 The O'Reilly Factor a news talk program hosted by Bill O'Reilly once cable news's top-rated show, features commentary and interviews
 Outnumbered Overtime with Harris Faulkner, a midday news/interview program
 Pat Sajak Weekend, a weekend talk program
 Pet News, a two-hour call in program about domestic animals
 Red Eye, a late night talk show hosted by Tom Shillue and formerly Greg Gutfeld.
 The Schneider Report, FNC's original evening-news program, hosted by Mike Schneider
 Shepard Smith Reporting, American television news/opinion/talk program on Fox News Channel hosted by Shepard Smith which aired from 2002 to 2019.
 Showdown with Larry Elder a one time July 5, 2008 show or special hosted by Larry Elder; was never picked up as a regular show on the Fox News after the July 5, 2008 airing
 Special Report with Brit Hume, hosted by former Washington managing editor Brit Hume
 Sunday Best with Jane Skinner, reviewed the network's previous week's stories and commentaries
 That Regan Woman, an hour-long interview show hosted by Judith Regan
 Weekend Live, covered the latest news, politics, Hollywood, and many other subjects from Washington, D.C.

Fox Network programming

Fox News Channel acts as the de facto news division of the Fox broadcast network, providing coverage of major breaking news and select live events, such as the State of the Union speech. The network also manages Fox NewsEdge, a distribution service of footage and reports for local Fox affiliates' news broadcasts.

In addition to news coverage, the network produces Fox News Sunday, a Sunday morning talk show featuring interviews with national leaders in politics and public life, hosted by Chris Wallace. From 2007 - 2009, the network produced The Morning Show with Mike and Juliet, a syndicated morning program featuring celebrity interviews, a live studio audience, and segments relating to viewers, hosted by past-DaySide and Fox & Friends Weekend hosts, Juliet Huddy and Mike Jerrick (Produced by FNC's sister division 20th Television and cancelled in the summer of 2009).

Since the original launch of FNC, the network has tried multiple times to produce newsmagazine programs for the network. Some of these programs have been canceled due to low ratings, including Fox Files, The Pulse, and Geraldo at Large (which returned to FNC in February 2007 as a weekend show).  But others, like Hannity's America, continue to thrive. Bill O'Reilly has said he considers his top rated show - The O'Reilly Factor to be in the format of a newsmagazine. He points to the inclusion of regular features such as 'Pinheads & Patriots' and the weekly 'The Great American Culture Quiz', which has very little to do with politics, to bolster his point.

FoxNews.com Live programming
Internet-only content that began during the 2008 election season. It was originally known as the Strategy Room until after the 2010 elections.

References

Fox News TV Schedule

External links
  – Fox News Channel
 Fox News Live

Fox News
Fox News